Patzau is an unincorporated community, in Douglas County, in the town of Summit, in the northwestern part of the U.S. state of Wisconsin.

County Road BB serves as a main route in the community. Wisconsin Highway 35 is nearby.

Patzau is located southwest of the city of Superior.

History
The community was named after Pacov (then Patzau) in what is now the Czech Republic, by a cattle dealer from the town.

Patzau is a former railroad community. Soo Line operated a yard there in the early to mid 1900s.

References

Unincorporated communities in Douglas County, Wisconsin
Unincorporated communities in Wisconsin